The Chief of the General Staff is the professional head of the Chad National Army. He is responsible for the administration and the operational control of the Chadian military. The current Chief of General Staff is General Abakar Abdelkarim Daoud who was appointed by President Idriss Déby on 31 January 2020, succeeding General Tahir Erda Tahirou.

List of officeholders

References

Military of Chad
Chad